In pharmacokinetics, a maintenance dose is the maintenance rate [mg/h] of drug administration equal to the rate of elimination at steady state.  This is not to be confused with dose regimen, which is a type of drug therapy in which the dose [mg] of a drug is given at a regular dosing interval on a repetitive basis. Continuing the maintenance dose for about 4 to 5 half-lives (t½) of the drug will approximate the steady state level. One or more doses higher than the maintenance dose can be given together at the beginning of therapy with a loading dose.

A loading dose is most useful for drugs that are eliminated from the body relatively slowly.  Such drugs need only a low maintenance dose in order to keep the amount of the drug in the body at the appropriate level, but this also means that, without an initial higher dose, it would take a long time for the amount of the drug in the body to reach that level.

Calculating the maintenance dose 

The required maintenance dose may be calculated as:

Where:
{|
| MD || is the maintenance dose rate [mg/h]
|-
| Cp || = desired peak concentration of drug [mg/L]
|-
| CL || = clearance of drug in body [L/h]
|-
| F || = bioavailability
|}

For an intravenously administered drug, the bioavailability F will equal 1, since the drug is directly introduced to the bloodstream. If the patient requires an oral dose, bioavailability will be less than 1 (depending upon absorption, first pass metabolism etc.), requiring a larger loading dose.

See also 
 Therapeutic index

References

Pharmacokinetics